Sommerlad is a surname. People with that name include:

 Ernest Sommerlad (1886-1952), Australian politician, father of Lloyd
 Lloyd Sommerlad (1919–2014), Australian politician, son of Ernest

See also
 Penman and Sommerlad, a weekly investigations column in the Daily Mirror
 Somerled (mid-12th-century), Norse-Gaelic lord who created the Kingdom of Argyll and the Isles